Lilyvale is a locality most of whose area is within the Royal National Park, south of Sydney, New South Wales, Australia. Helensburgh railway station was within the southern populated part of the locality. A Lilyvale railway station was open from 1890 until 1983.

History
Lilyvale Post Office opened on 1 October 1898 and closed in 1931.

Heritage listings
Lilyvale has a number of heritage-listed sites, including:
 Illawarra railway: Lilyvale railway tunnels
 Royal National Park: Coastal Cabin Communities

Notes

 
Suburbs of Wollongong
City of Wollongong